Catherine (Cathy) Drennan is an American biochemist and crystallographer. She is Professor of Chemistry and Biology at the Massachusetts Institute of Technology and the Howard Hughes Medical Institute.

Early life and education 
Drennan grew up in New York with her parents (a medical doctor and anthropologist). She received a Bachelors in Chemistry from Vassar College, working in the laboratory of Professor Miriam Ross. After college, Drennan spent time as high school science and drama teacher, in a quaker run school in Iowa.  She received her PhD in biological chemistry from the University of Michigan in 1995, working in the laboratory of the late Professor Martha L Ludwig. Drennan's thesis is titled "Crystallographic studies of FMN and Vitamin B12 Dependent Enzymes: Flavodoxin and Methionine Synthase". After her PhD, she joined Douglas Rees as a postdoctoral fellow in the California Institute of Technology.

Drennan is dyslexic, but believes this has advantages in science, "don't listen to what anyone tells you what you can or cannot do...there is no dyslexia ceiling". At high school, Drennan was told "she was probably not even going to graduate high school because of her dyslexia".

Research 
Drennan joined the faculty at the Massachusetts Institute of Technology in 1999. At Massachusetts Institute of Technology, Drennan focuses on innovation in education and fundamental research. She is interested in the future of college classrooms and creating a positive learning environment for diverse groups of students. She is recognized for her contributions to science pedagogy. In 2006 Drennan was named an HHMI Professor and awarded a $1 million grant to support educational initiatives for “Getting Biologists Excited about Chemistry”.

Drennan has studied enzymes that employ vitamin B12 since she was a graduate student. Her research focus is metalloproteins and metalloenzymes, and developing structural approaches to visualize enzymes. Her group uses X-ray crystallography and electron microscopy to characterize metalloproteins in action. She is interested in conformational change during catalysis. Her work also contributes to protecting the environment, as metals act as molecular helpers in chemical reactions. Drennan is the author of over 100 Protein Data Bank submissions.

Awards and honors 
2000 - Surdna Foundation Research Award
2000 - Cecil and Ida Green Career Development Chair
2001 - Searle Scholar
2002 - Presidential Early Career Award for Scientists and Engineers
2003 - ASBMB–Schering–Plough Research Institute Scientific Achievement Award
2004 - Harold E. Edgerton Faculty Achievement Award
2005 - Everett Moore Baker Memorial Award for Excellence in Undergraduate Teaching
2006 - Howard Hughes Medical Institute Professor
2008 - Howard Hughes Medical Institute Investigator
2017 - Winter Commencement Bicentennial Alumni Award
2020 - American Academy of Arts and Sciences

References 

Living people
University of Michigan alumni
American women biochemists
American crystallographers
Vassar College alumni
Year of birth missing (living people)
Scientists with dyslexia